Electoral reform in Alabama refers to efforts to change the voting laws in the Yellowhammer State. In 2006, HB 711 was introduced to use preferential ballots for overseas military voters' it was passed by the Alabama House of Representatives. In March 2007, the 11th Circuit Court of Appeals heard arguments as to whether Alabama election law unfairly restricts third-party and independent candidates from the state ballot. Candidates are required to collect signatures from 3% of the total number of voters who voted in the previous gubernatorial election in order to gain ballot access. Ordinarily, such candidates would gather signatures at the polling place at the party primary, but Alabama made it more difficult by moving the deadline for signature turn-in to the date of the primary. Alabama ranks third nationally in disenfranchising formerly incarcerated persons. One out of every 14 Alabama residents is disenfranchised. To regain the right to vote, individuals convicted of crimes of “moral turpitude” who have completed a felony sentence must apply to the Alabama Board of Pardons and Paroles for a Certificate of Eligibility to Register to Vote. As soon as you apply for a Pardon you automatically receive the right to vote back. This is the new rule of law and was passed through the House and the Senate due to voter disenfranchisement. In 2007, HB 192 was introduced to join the National Popular Vote Interstate Compact, but it failed in the Constitution & Elections committee.

Ballot access
Major party candidates are nominated by the state primary process. Independent candidates are granted ballot access through a petition process and minor political party candidates are nominated by convention along with a petition process; one must collect 3% of the total votes cast in the last election for the specific race or 3% of the total votes cast in the last gubernatorial election for state-wide ballot access. The figure for 2006 state wide ballot access was 41,012 good signatures. The validity of signatures generally means that 20-30% more signatures will need to be collected to ensure that the goal is achieved. To retain ballot access a third party has to poll 20% in a state wide race and it will retain statewide ballot access through to the next election. Many third party reformers, such as Bill Redpath, would like to see the ballot access laws loosened.

References

External links
FairVote Alabama

Alabama
Politics of Alabama
Electoral reform